Vahid Heydarieh (January 1, 1993) is an Iranian football defender, who currently plays for Persian Gulf Pro League club Persepolis and the Iran national under-23 football team.

Club career

Paykan
He was part of Paykan Academy. He had been promoted to first team after poor result in 2012–13 season. He made his debut for Paykan against Tractor Sazi on 31 December 2012.

Persepolis
On 13 July 2015 Heydarieh joined Persian Gulf Pro League club Persepolis on a three-year contract. Heydarieh was injured for an extended period at the beginning of the season.

Club career statistics

International career

U20
He was part of Iran U–20 during 2012 AFC U-19 Championship qualification, 2012 CIS Cup, 2012 AFF U-19 Youth Championship and 2012 AFC U-19 Championship.

U23
He invited to Iran U-23 training camp by Nelo Vingada to preparation for Incheon 2014 and 2016 AFC U-22 Championship (Summer Olympic qualification). He named in Iran U23 final list for Incheon 2014.

Honours
Foolad
Hazfi Cup: 2020–21
Iranian Super Cup: 2021

References

External links
 Vahid Heydarieh at PersianLeague

1993 births
Living people
Sportspeople from Tehran
Iranian footballers
Paykan F.C. players
Persepolis F.C. players
Iran under-20 international footballers
Association football defenders
Footballers at the 2014 Asian Games
Asian Games competitors for Iran